New Berlin is the name of several locations in the United States:

 New Berlin, Illinois
 New Berlin (town), New York
 New Berlin (village), New York
 New Berlin, Pennsylvania
 New Berlin, Texas
 New Berlin, Wisconsin

See also
 Berlin, capital of Germany
 Berlin (disambiguation)
 Berliner (disambiguation)
 East Berlin (disambiguation)
 West Berlin (disambiguation)
 Berlin Township (disambiguation)
 Nuevo Berlín, Uruguay